Tripylidae is a family of nematodes belonging to the order Enoplida.

Genera

Genera:
 Abunema Khera, 1971
 Andrassya Brzeski, 1960
 Anguillula Ehrenberg, 1831

References

Nematodes